Allen C. Kolstad (December 24, 1931 – August 2, 2008) was an American farmer and politician from Montana.  A Republican from Chester in Liberty County, Montana, he was prominent in state politics for more than 40 years, beginning in 1968 with his election to the state House of Representatives. He served in the  state House and later the Senate for 20 years until he was elected the 25th Lieutenant Governor of Montana on the ticket headed by Stan Stephens in 1988.

Kolstad ran unsuccessfully for U.S. Senate in the 1990 election, losing to incumbent Democratic Senator Max Baucus. He resigned from the post of lieutenant governor in 1991 to accept a presidential appointment to the International Boundary Commission.

Kolstad was elected Montana's Republican national committeeman in 2004 to a term expiring in September 2009, but he resigned on December 15, 2007 due to health reasons.

References

1931 births
2008 deaths
Lieutenant Governors of Montana
American people of Norwegian descent
Republican Party members of the Montana House of Representatives
Republican Party Montana state senators
People from Chester, Montana
20th-century American politicians